OSP, an Environment for Operating System Projects, is a teaching operating system designed to provide an environment for an introductory course in operating systems.  By selectively omitting specific modules of the operating system and having the students re-implement the missing functionality, an instructor can generate projects that require students to understand fundamental operating system concepts.

The distribution includes the OSP project generator, which can be used to package a project and produce stubs (files that are empty except for required components, and that can be compiled) for the files that the students must implement.  OSP includes a simulator that the student code runs on.

See also
 Mobile operating system
 Network operating system
 Operating system

References 
 OSP: An Environment for Operating System Projects by Michael Kifer and Scott A. Smolka, Addison Wesley, 1991, 86 pages (2nd printing in 1992).

External links 
 1992 paper (ACM portal)
 1996 paper

Discontinued operating systems